The 1997 season was Santos Futebol Clube's eighty-fifth in existence and the club's third-eighth consecutive season in the top flight of Brazilian football.

Players

Squad

Source: Acervo Santista

Statistics

Appearances and goals

Source: Match reports in Competitive matches

Goalscorers

Source: Match reports in Competitive matches

Transfers

In

Out

Friendlies

Competitions

Campeonato Brasileiro

Results summary

First stage

Matches

Second stage

Matches

Copa do Brasil

Preliminary round

First round

Second round

Campeonato Paulista

First stage

Group 4

Matches

Final stage

Matches

Torneiro Rio-São Paulo

Quarter-finals

Semi-finals

Finals

Copa dos Campeões Mundiais

First stage

Matches

Supercopa Libertadores

Group stage

Matches

References

Santos FC seasons
Brazilian football clubs 1997 season